The Görlitz Zoo is a zoo in Görlitz, in Saxony, Germany.

History 
Görlitz Zoo was founded 1957 upon the initiative of the mayor of Görlitz, Bruno Gleißberg, and the directors of gardens, Henry Kraft, on the private grounds of the factory owner, Richard Raupach, which was given to the public of Görlitz after 1945.

Among the first enclosures was for wild boars and roe deers, a pony stable, and "Bärenzwinger", a cage for brown bears, followed, in the early 1960s, by enclosures for fallow deers, monkeys and a bird aviary, as well as a kitchen to prepare foods for the animals.

Number of visitors 
 2011: 105.000 
 2014: 130.000 
 2015: 140.000

Management 
 until 2011: Axel Gebauer
 since 2011: Sven Hammer

Pictures

See also 
 List of zoos in Germany

References

External links 

 
 Görlitz Zoo at Zoo-Infos.de (in English)

Zoos in Germany
Zoos established in 1957
Zoological Garden
Zoological Garden